Ronde van Zeeland Seaports is a single-day road bicycle race held annually in Zeeland, Netherlands. The race was created in 2012, as a 1.1 race on the UCI Europe Tour, after financial issues curtailed the Delta Tour Zeeland stage-race, which had been held since 2008. The first race was won by South African rider Reinardt Janse van Rensburg of the  team.

The first three editions of the race were held in June, but for the 2015 edition, the race was moved to March.  After 2015, the race was no longer held, but in 2017 was replaced with its spiritual successor, the Tacx Pro Classic.

Winners

References

External links
  

Cycle races in the Netherlands
UCI Europe Tour races
Cycling in Zeeland
Recurring sporting events established in 2012
2012 establishments in the Netherlands